Jerome Opeña is a Filipino comic book artist best known for his numerous collaborations with writer Rick Remender.

Early life
Opeña was born in the Philippines, and spent most of his childhood in Taiwan, where his father worked for an international agricultural organization that was based there. When Opeña was approximately 16, his family moved to the United States, where he has lived ever since. Opeña attended art school for four years, and graduated when he was 24 years old.

Career
After he graduated from art school, Opeña "floated around for a few years, did a lot of odd jobs here and there and the occasional illustration or concept art job", as well as some comic work. Opeña began work full-time in the industry in 2005 when he met Rick Remender, with whom he has collaborated on many of his projects. In 2009 he drew Vengeance of the Moon Knight ongoing series with writer Gregg Hurwitz. As part of the Marvel NOW! relaunch of Marvel's titles, Opeña teamed with writer Jonathan Hickman to launch The Avengers vol. 5 series in February 2013. he drew The first three issue.  He drew the Infinity limited series in 2013 with writer Jonathan Hickman.

In September 2019 He drew Spawn issue 300 ,issue 301, an oversized anniversary issue , with various artists. He also provided variant cover.

Personal life
Opeña lives in Brooklyn, New York City.

Bibliography
Interior comic work includes: 
Star Wars Tales #13: "Mace Windu — The Sith in the Shadow" (with Bob Harris, anthology, Dark Horse, 2002)
Métal Hurlant vol. 2 #3: "Who's Dreaming Now?" (with Alejandro Jodorowsky, anthology, Humanoids Publishing, 2003)
Lone (with Stuart Moore, Rocket Comics):
 "Bad Medicine" (in Rocket Comics: Ignite one-shot, 2003)
 "Once Upon a Time in the Wasteland" (in #1-4 and 6, 2003–2004)
Strange Girl #8 (with Rick Remender, Image, 2006)
Fear Agent (with Rick Remender):
 "Re-Ignition, Part 4" (with Tony Moore, in #4, Image, 2006)
 "My War" (in #5-10, Image, 2006–2007)
 "Hatchet Job" (with Kieron Dwyer, in #17-19 and 21, Dark Horse, 2007–2008)
Wolverine (one-shots, Marvel):
 Dangerous Games: "Purity" (with Rick Remender, anthology, 2008)
 Flies to a Spider: "Swallowed the Spider" (with Gregg Hurwitz, 2009)
The Punisher vol. 8 #1-5: "Living in Darkness" (with Rick Remender, Marvel, 2009)
Vengeance of the Moon Knight #1-6: "Shock and Awe" (with Gregg Hurwitz, Marvel, 2009)
Deadpool #1000: "Appetite for Destruction" (with Rick Remender, anthology, Marvel, 2010)
Uncanny X-Force #1-4, 14-18 (with Rick Remender, Marvel, 2010–2012)
The Avengers vol. 5 #1-3 (with Jonathan Hickman, Marvel, 2013)
Infinity #2-6 (with Jonathan Hickman, Dustin Weaver (#2-5) and Jim Cheung (#6), Marvel, 2013–2014)
The Avengers: Rage of Ultron (with Rick Remender and Pepe Larraz, graphic novel, Marvel, 2015)
Seven to Eternity #1-6, 9-17 (with Rick Remender, Image, 2016–2021)
Spawn #300-301 (with Todd McFarlane, among other artists, Image, 2019)

Covers only

Notes

References

External links

Living people
Filipino comics artists
Year of birth missing (living people)